Matthew Hudson-Smith (born 26 October 1994) is a British track and field sprinter who specialises in the 400 metres. He holds, as of July 2022, the British record, running a personal best of 44.35 seconds for the distance set at Eugene, Oregon in the 2022 Diamond League meeting. He was the 2018 European Champion in 400 metres, and a member of the gold-winning teams in the 4 x 400 metre relay at the 2014 European Athletics Championships, with Great Britain and 2014 Commonwealth Games with England.

In the summer of 2022 he won his first individual global medal, a bronze, in the 2022 World Championships, only the second British male after Roger Black to win a World Championships medal in the event. Weeks later, at his home track in Birmingham, United Kingdom he won the silver medal at the Commonwealth Games representing England, before retaining his European title at the 2022 European Championships event in Munich. By retaining his 400-metre European crown, he matched the achievements of countrymen Roger Black and Martyn Rooney. He is, as of 2022, the most decorated British athlete in European Championships history, with seven medals, second overall only to French sprinter Christophe Lemaitre.

Career
Born in Wolverhampton, he joined his local athletics club, Birchfield Harriers, in 2006. He competed in a variety of events before focusing more on the sprints from 2008 onwards. In 2010 and 2011 he mainly concentrated as a 200 metres runner. He was runner-up at the English Schools Championships over that distance in both 2011 and 2012 before finally winning the title in 2013 at the age of eighteen, after returning from a series of hamstring injuries and illness. During 2012 to 2013 he studied on the AASE Apprenticeship at Loughborough College and is now a Physical Education and Sports Coaching student at the University of Worcester,  allowing him to continue his education at the same time as training and competing.

That year also saw his international debut for Great Britain: he performed well at the 2013 European Athletics Junior Championships, setting a 200 m best of 20.88 seconds in the semi-finals before getting the bronze medal in a British medal sweep, behind Nethaneel Mitchell-Blake and Leon Reid. He won a second bronze as part of the British 4×400 metres relay team, running the second leg.

In the 2014 season he returned to competing in the 400 m, working under his coach Tony Hadley. Coming from a personal best of 48.76 seconds at the start of the year, his new focus on the event greatly improved his times. He ran of 46.29 seconds at the Tom Jones Memorial Invitational in Florida in April, then set a best of 45.80 seconds in Belgium in May. He ran a quick race at the British Athletics Championships, but was disqualified for a lane infringement.

His following race at the Glasgow Grand Prix marked a career breakthrough as he finished in the top three at the Diamond League race in a time of 44.97 seconds. This made him only the second British teenager to dip under 45 seconds for the distance and placed him second on the European rankings for the season. Hudson-Smith surprised himself with the level of improvement, saying "I've no idea where that came from, no idea at all". He was chosen to represent England at the 2014 Commonwealth Games in the 4×400 m relay alongside Conrad Williams, Michael Bingham, and Daniel Awde. On his return to Glasgow for the Commonwealth Games he ran the fastest split on the final leg to overhaul Trinidad and Tobago's Zwede Hewitt and hold off Olympic champion Chris Brown, winning the gold medal for the team.

At the 2014 European Athletics Championships in Zürich, Switzerland, Hudson-Smith won the silver medal in the individual 400 m in a time of 44.75 seconds, behind compatriot Martyn Rooney. This is despite receiving a yellow card (warning) from the officials for not being stable in the set position.

Personal bests
400 metres – 44.35 sec (2022)
200 metres – 20.60 sec (2020)
60 metres – 6.96 sec (2012)

International competition record

References

External links

Living people
1994 births
Sportspeople from Wolverhampton
English male sprinters
British male sprinters
Olympic male sprinters
Olympic athletes of Great Britain
Athletes (track and field) at the 2016 Summer Olympics
Commonwealth Games gold medallists for England
Commonwealth Games medallists in athletics
Athletes (track and field) at the 2014 Commonwealth Games
Athletes (track and field) at the 2018 Commonwealth Games
European Championships (multi-sport event) silver medalists
World Athletics Championships athletes for Great Britain
World Athletics Championships medalists
European Athletics Championships winners
British Athletics Championships winners
Black British sportspeople
Medallists at the 2014 Commonwealth Games